Psycho White is a collaborative EP by American drummer Travis Barker and rapper Yelawolf. It was released on November 13, 2012, under LaSalle Records and Killer Distribution. The first single of the EP, "Push 'Em" was released as a free download via Yelawolf's Twitter page and on numerous hip hop websites on September 12. The artwork was released the same day as well as a behind-the-scenes video of how the artwork was created.

Yelawolf and Travis Barker broke down the meaning behind their project track-by-track with Sean Lynch of The Source Magazine. Part 1 also saw Yelawolf and Travis Barker hinting at a possible sequel and Warped Tour dates.

A remix version of the single "Push 'Em" by Steve Aoki and Travis Barker, was later released on Dim Mak Records.

Commercial performance 
In its first week, Psycho White sold 111,962 copies debuting at number 7 on the US Billboard 200 chart. As of 2016 there has been a total of 538,101 copies sold

Track listing

Personnel
Credits for Psycho White adapted from Allmusic.

Tim Armstrong – composer, featured artist, guitar, background vocals
Travis Barker – executive producer, drum programming, drums, primary artist, producer
Kevin Bivona – keyboards
Brian "Big Bass" Gardner – mastering
Chris Holmes – engineer
Mix Master Mike – cut, scratching, producer
Dawaun Parker – composer
Neal H. Pogue – mixing
Skinhead Rob – featured artist, background vocals
Lawrence Vavra – management
Francesco Vescovi – artwork, cover art
Jenniger Wienman – publicity
Yelawolf - executive producer, primary artist, composer

References

Albums produced by Travis Barker
Travis Barker albums
Yelawolf EPs
2012 EPs